Mataban District is a district in the central Hiran region of Hirshabelle state of Somalia.

References

Districts of Somalia
Hiran, Somalia